The Wesley Logan Prize is an annual prize given to a historian by the Association for the Study of Afro-American Life & History

Background 

The Wesley-Logan Prize is jointly sponsored by the American Historical Association and the Association for the Study of African American Life. The prize is awarded annually for an outstanding book in African diaspora history. The prize was established in 1992 in memory of two early pioneers in history, Charles H. Wesley and Rayford W. Logan.

Eligibility 

The nominated books must have been published between May 1 of the previous year and April 30 of the entry year.

Notable winners 

Past winners of the prize include:

 2021 - Jessica Marie Johnson, Wicked Flesh: Black Women, Intimacy, and Freedom in the Atlantic World 
 2020 - Benjamin Talton, In This Land of Plenty: Mickey Leland and Africa in American Politics
 2019 - Yuko Miki, Frontiers of Citizenship: A Black and Indigenous History of Postcolonial Brazil
 2018 - Monique Bedasse, Jah Kingdom: Rastafarians, Tanzania, and Pan-Africanism in the Age of Decolonization
 2017 - Sowande' Mustakeem, Slavery at Sea: Terror, Sex, and Sickness in the Middle Passage
 2016 - Carina Ray, 'Crossing the Color Line: Race, Sex, and the Contested Politics of Colonialism in Ghana 
 2015 - Ada Ferrer, Freedom’s Mirror: Cuba and Haiti in the Age of Revolution 
 2014 - Jacob S. Dorman, Chosen People: The Rise of American Black Israelite Religions 
 2013 - Martha Biondi, Black Revolution on Campus 
 2012 - Erik McDuffie, Sojourning for Freedom: Black Women, American Communism and the Making of Black Left Feminism 
 2011 - Frank Guridy, Forging Diaspora: Afro-Cuban and African Americans in a World of Empire and Jim Crow 
 2010 - Pier Larson, Ocean of Letters: Language and Creolization in an Indian Ocean Diaspora 
 2009 - Alexander Byrd, Captives and Voyagers: Black Migrants across the Eighteenth-Century British Atlantic World 
 2008 - Paul Johnson, Diaspora Conversions: Black Carib Religion and the Recovery of Africa 
 2007 - Laura Adderley, New Negroes from Africa': Slave Trade Abolition and Free African Settlement in the Nineteenth-Century Caribbean 
 2007 - Sylviane Diouf, Dreams of Africa in Alabama: The Slave Ship Clotilda and the Story of the Last Africans Brought to America 
 2006 - Kenneth M. Bilby, True-Born Maroons 
 2005 - Melvin Ely, Israel on the Appomattox: A Southern Experiment in Black Freedom from the 1790s through the Civil War 
 2004 - James Sweet, Recreating Africa: Culture, Kinship, and Religion in the African-Portuguese World
 2003 - Leslie Harris, In the Shadows of Slavery: African Americans in New York City
 2002 - Julie Winch, A Gentleman of Color: The Life of James Forten 
 2001 - Eric Arnesen, Brotherhoods of Color: Black Railroad Workers and the Struggle for Equality 
 2000 - David Eltis, The Rise of African Slavery in the Americas 
 1999 - Kim Butler, Freedoms Given, Freedoms Won: Afro-Brazilians in Post-Abolition San Paulo and Salvador
 1998 - Philip D. Morgan, Slave Counterpoint: Black Culture in the Eighteenth-Century Chesapeake and Lowcountry 
 1997 - W. Jeffrey Bolster, Black Jacks: African American Seamen in the Age of Sail
 1997 - Brenda Plummer, Rising Wind: Black Americans and U.S. Foreign Aid 
 1996 - Gretchen Lemke-Santangelo, Abiding Courage: African American Migrant Women and the East Bay Community 
 1995 - Aline Helg, Our Rightful Share: The Afro-Cuban Struggle for Equality
 1994 - Richard Thomas, Life for Us Is What We Make It: Building Black Community in Detroit

See also

 List of history awards

References

External links
 

Academic awards